Down the Road Wherever is the ninth solo studio album by British singer-songwriter and guitarist Mark Knopfler, released on 16 November 2018 by British Grove Records via Virgin EMI in the UK and via Blue Note in the US.

Overview
The album was announced in a press release, which called it a collection of "unhurriedly elegant new Knopfler songs inspired by a wide range of subjects, including his early days in Deptford with Dire Straits, a stray football fan lost in a strange town, the compulsion of a musician hitching home through the snow, and a man out of time in his local greasy spoon." The 14 songs were also called "slow and elegant".

Musicians who play on the album include Jim Cox and Guy Fletcher on keyboards, Nigel Hitchcock on saxophone, Glenn Worf on bass guitar, Danny Cummings on percussion and Ian Thomas on drums. Imelda May also provides backing vocals.

A music video for the first single, "Good on You Son", was released in September.

Release
Down the Road Wherever was made available in a variety of formats, including on CD, 2×LP and in a box set; the box set includes the preceding two formats as well as a 12-inch EP including four extra tracks. The deluxe CD inserts two bonus tracks before the final standard edition track, "Matchstick Man". Lyrics for the 20th song, "Back in the Day", were released online and printed in the 2019 tourbook but the song was never released as it was withdrawn.

Track listing

Personnel
Musicians
 Mark Knopfler – guitars, vocals
 Richard Bennett – guitars
 Glenn Worf – upright and electric bass
 Guy Fletcher – keyboards
 Jim Cox – keyboards
 Ian Thomas – drums
 Danny Cummings – percussion

Additional musicians
 Lance Ellington – background vocalist
 Beverley Skeete – background vocalist
 Katie Kissoon – background vocalist
 Kris Drever - background vocalist
 Imelda May - background vocalist
 Nigel Hitchcock – tenor saxophone
 Tom Walsh – trumpet
 Trevor Mires – trombone
 John McCusker – fiddle
 Mike McGoldrick – whistle
 Robbie McIntosh – guitar

Production
 Engineers: Guy Fletcher, Martin Hollis
 Assistant engineers: Rowan McIntosh, Jason Elliot, Andy Cook, Poppy Kavanagh, Josh Tyrell

Charts

Weekly charts

Year-end charts

Certifications

References

2018 albums
Mark Knopfler albums
Virgin EMI Records albums
Albums produced by Mark Knopfler
Albums produced by Guy Fletcher